The 2019 Italian motorcycle Grand Prix was the sixth round of the 2019 MotoGP season. It was held at the Mugello Circuit in Scarperia on 2 June 2019.

Classification

MotoGP

Moto2

Moto3

Championship standings after the race

MotoGP

Moto2

Moto3

Notes

References

External links

Italian
Motorcycle Grand Prix
Italian motorcycle Grand Prix
Italian motorcycle Grand Prix